Svirlag, SvirLAG (Svirskiy Lager' – Svir Concentration-Camp, also  /  – ) was a Soviet forced labour camp run by NKVD's GULAG Directorate. It was located on the river Svir (hence the name Svirskiy in Russian) in the forests by the town Lodeynoye Pole, 244 km north-east of Saint Petersburg, in Leningrad oblast, Vepsland – the land of the Vepses, operated in the 1930s (Joseph Stalin's time) and onwards. SvirLAG concentration camp was supplier of wood to Moscow and Saint Petersburg.

The camp was established on November 17, 1931.

The number of those who died or were killed in Svirlag in 1930s (the times of the most numerous and heavy executions that took place in SvirLAG seem to be 1931–1937) is measured in thousands of victims. In 1935, 36.500 inmates were kept in this camp.

The camp was located in the medieval buildings of what was formerly the Alexander-Svirsky Monastery.  Bolsheviks closed and vandalized the monastery in 1918 (it finally ceased in 1925). The holy relics were removed, monks partly executed and partly expelled. The chief of the monastery archimandrite Evgeniy Trofimov was executed on October 23, 1918 along with 5 monks behind the monastery walls. The monastery buildings were turned into prisons, barracks, and mental asylum. On September 22, 1998 Ministry of Culture of Russia and Russian Ministry of State Property signed decree about delivery of monastery back to Saint Petersburg parish of Russian Orthodox Church.

Svirlag compared in GULAG system
"The situation review" of GULAG for October 1935 presents the average composition of the camp population as for October 1934 – 694,100 persons, as for October 1935 – 828,800 persons and of these 36,500 were concentrated in SvirLAG – 6th by size along with Bamlag (the biggest with 190,300 inmates in Svobodnyi, Amur Oblast), Dmitlag (193,300 inmates), Volgolag on Volga, Belbaltlag (82,000 inmates) and Ukhtpechlag in Ukhta, Temlag (21,100 inmates), Dallag (70,200 inmates), Siblag (Siberian concentration camp 74,600 inmates), Sazlag, Karlag (34,100 inmates), Prorvlag, Sarlag, Vetlag, Sevvostlag (47,700 inmates), Vaygach, Norilsklag in Norilsk.

Convicts and victims
Political and church convicts were kept there. Only 1 of 4 was a criminal.

The administration of the camp was based in Svirstroy (Svir Construction Directorate) on the  Svir River. The convicted inmates worked in mines extracting mica, stone and clay.

Sampson Sievers – hieromonk (born of English mother) of Saint Petersburg's Alexander Nevsky Lavra was imprisoned and tortured in this camp (from 1932, what is witnessed by archival documents and personal testimonies), though survived.

Among other inmates who were imprisoned or executed in SvirLAG were:

 Archbishop Augustine (Alexander Belayev) (imprisoned in SvirLAG in 1931–1934, executed November 23, 1937), Russian Orthodox archbishop.
 Vladimir Vorobyev (b. in 1876  in  Russia's Saratov Region, sat in SvirLAG in 1931–1932, died in Kuybyshev prison in 1940 from heart paralysis) – archeologist and Russian Orthodox parish priest.
 Stepan Rudnytskyi – Ukrainian geographer, founder of Ukrainian geography (born in Tarnopol in 1877, then Austro-Hungary), sat in SvirLAG in 1933–1937 where he was also executed in 1937 .
 Yulian Shpol (literary name, in life: Mykhaylo Yalovyi – Ukrainian writer (born in Poltava region), arrested in 1933 and May 11, 1934 with special convoy sent to SvirLAG, 2,5 years later executed in SvirLAG November 3, 1937.
 Magzhan Zhumabayev – Kazakh poet, arrested by Soviet authorities in 1929, sent to Svirlag where he was imprisoned until June 2, 1934. Arrested again in 1935 in Alma-Ata, March 1938  he was executed by organs of NKVD.

Archival statistics tells that only in one year of 1932  1,569 died or were executed in Svirlag and in 1935  3,887 inmates more died or were killed in Svirlag, this makes total of 5,456 victims just in two years of 1932  and 1935.

References

External links

 Statistics on numbers of victims of Soviet concentration camps by Timofeev (in Russian), presents also SvirLAG
 The official site of Alexander-Svirsky Monastery, buildings of which had been used for Svirlag in 1930 s

 

Camps of the Gulag
Political repression in the Soviet Union
NKVD